Jean Michel Massing is a French art historian. He has taught at the University of Cambridge since 1977.

Early life 

Massing was born in 1948, the son of Adrienne and Joseph Massing, mayor of Sarreguemines (1953–67). After receiving a baccalauréat in philosophy in 1967, he continued his studies at University of Strasbourg, where he graduated in Archaeology and History of Art in 1971. He then completed a master's degree with a thesis on the Temptations of St Anthony (1974). His Doctorat dès lettres (1985) focused on the iconography of the Calumny of Apelles. From 1974 to 1977 Massing had a scholarship at the Warburg Institute of London. In 1975, he married Ann, a painting restorer and painting conservation historian, who taught at the Hamilton Kerr Institute from 1978 to 2006.

Career 
Since 1977, Massing has taught in the Department of History of Art at the University of Cambridge, first as Assistant Lecturer (1977–82), Lecturer (1982-1997), Reader (1997–2004) and Professor in History of Art from 2004. He was Head of department from 1996 to 1998 and from 2012 to 2014. He was elected a Fellow of King's College, Cambridge in 1982 and a Fellow of the Society of Antiquaries in 1991. He has been a Syndic of the Fitzwilliam Museum since 1998, a Trustee of the Stained Glass Museum, Ely since 2003 and was a Committee Member of Kettle's Yard from 2012 to 2014. He was made Chevalier (1995) then Officer (2005) in the Ordre des Arts et des Lettres, French Order of Arts and Letters.

He published widely on topics including Classical art and its influence from Antiquity to the Renaissance, astrological imagery, religious imagery (especially the Temptations of St. Anthony, from Schongauer to Bosch) and various iconographies, for example the Ars memorativa, the emergence of the emblem and emblematic symbolism. More recently he has been working on African art from the sixteenth to the nineteenth century, on the relationships between European and non-European cultures from the Middle Ages to the nineteenth century, and on Micronesian art, with articles on the history of cartography and the representations of foreign lands and peoples. Central to his current research is the image of people of African origin in western art. He has been a major contributor to large exhibitions, such as Circa 1492: Art in the Age of Exploration and Encompassing the Globe: Portugal and the World in the 16th and 17th centuries.

He published and edited multiple books: Du texte à l'image. La Calomnie d'Apelle et son iconographie, Splendours of Flanders, Late Medieval Art from Cambridge Collections, Etudes offertes à Jean Schaub. Festschrift Jean Schaub, Erasmian Wit and Proverbial Wisdom. An Illustrated Moral Compendium for François 1er, Studies in Imagery: Text and Images, Studies in Imagery: The World Discovered, Triumph, Protection & Dreams: East African Headrests in Context, The Slave in European Art: From Renaissance Trophy to Abolitionist Emblem, Marfins no Impéro Português/Ivories of the Portuguese Empire, and King's College Chapel, 1515-2015: Art, Music and Religion in Cambridge.

External links
 Interviewed by Alan Macfarlane 5 December 2014 (video)

References

1948 births
Living people
French art historians
Fellows of King's College, Cambridge
University of Strasbourg alumni